The Big Classic sandwich was a hamburger sold by the international fast-food restaurant chain Wendy's. The sandwich was intended to present a larger burger that appealed to the 18- to 36-year-old male demographic that desired a "heartier" product. It is one of only two named hamburger products sold by the company and was designed to compete against the Burger King Whopper sandwich.

Product description
The Big Classic was a  hamburger, consisting of a ¼ pound (113 g) beef patty, lettuce, tomatoes, mayonnaise, ketchup, onions, pickles and grill seasoning served on a Kaiser style roll. Cheese could be added upon request.

Variants
 Big Bacon Classic - adds Bacon

History
The Big Classic was introduced in September 1986 as part of a line of sandwiches that were launched during a major corporate restructuring of Wendy's. Initially, it was in a clamshell-style styrofoam; this was a clam container that form-fitted the sandwich but was replaced later on with its signature foil wrapper as a result of environmental concerns. Some years later the recipe was changed so that two strips of bacon were added, and the name changed to the Big Bacon Classic. It was replaced on the menu with the Baconator in June 2007, but one can still order the sandwich. The Big Bacon Classic returned to Wendy's menu in October 2009, was called the Bacon Deluxe, and contained four strips of bacon instead of two until its discontinuation in June 2012. The Bacon Deluxe was replaced on the menu by the Son of Baconator. If a customer wants a Bacon Deluxe, they can now add three pieces of bacon to a single, double, or triple classic cheeseburger.

See also
 Baconator

Similar sandwiches by other QSR vendors:

 Burger King Whopper
 McDonald's Big Mac

References

Wendy's foods
Fast food hamburgers